EMRS may refer to:
 Emergency Medical Retrieval Service, Scotland
 Eklavya Model Residential School, an educational body of India